This page lists public opinion polls conducted for the 2012 French legislative elections, which were held in two rounds on 10 and 17 June 2012.

Unless otherwise noted, all polls listed below are compliant with the regulations of the national polling commission (Commission nationale des sondages) and utilize the quota method.

Graphical summary 
The averages in the graphs below were constructed using polls listed below conducted by the nine major French pollsters. The graphs are smoothed 14-day weighted moving averages, using only the most recent poll conducted by any given pollster within that range (each poll weighted based on recency).

First round 
The comparison for the Left Front with 2007 is made against the French Communist Party and the New Centre against "presidential majority" candidates. Hunting, Fishing, Nature and Traditions and the Movement for France, which were counted individually in 2007, are included in the miscellaneous right total for that year, which would otherwise be 2.47%.

Second round seat projections 
Projections marked with an asterisk (*) were calculated based only on the first round results, not surveys before the second round.

The Ipsos survey conducted from 13 to 14 June consisted of 1,015 respondents in 157 constituencies with left-right duels, 775 respondents in 36 constituencies EELV-right duels, and 685 respondents in 27 constituencies in constituencies with a left-right-FN triangulaire.

The comparison for the Left Front with 2007 is made against the French Communist Party. Movement for France, which was counted individually in 2007, is included in the miscellaneous right total for that year, which would otherwise be 9 otherwise.

By constituency

First round

Ain's 5th 
No fieldwork date(s) were given for this poll; the date listed below is the publication date.

Aisne's 2nd

Alpes-Maritimes's 1st

Alpes-Maritimes's 2nd

Alpes-Maritimes's 3rd

Alpes-Maritimes's 4th

Aude's 2nd 
Didier Codorniou was eligible to continue through the second round, but instead withdrew and supported Marie-Hélène Fabre after the first round.

The TNS Sofres poll tested Jean-Pierre Nadal as the candidate of the FN; Laure-Emmanuelle Philippe was ultimately invested by the party.

Aveyron's 1st

Bouches-du-Rhône's 5th

Bouches-du-Rhône's 9th

Bouches-du-Rhône's 13th 
René Raimondi was eligible to continue through the second round, but abandoned his candidacy to the benefit of Gaby Charroux.

The CSA poll tested José Rodriguez as the candidate of the FN; Béatrix Espallardo was ultimately invested by the party.

Charente-Maritime's 1st 
In the Ifop-Fiducial poll conducted in December 2011, no Europe Ecology – The Greens or National Front candidates were named, François Drageon was described as a miscellaneous right candidate, and Bruno Leal was tested as a candidate of the Democratic Movement.

Corse-du-Sud's 1st

Corse-du-Sud's 2nd

Haute-Corse's 1st

Haute-Corse's 2nd

Gard's 2nd

Haute-Garonne's 3rd 
After the first round, Alain Fillola, though eligible to continue to the second round, withdrew his candidacy.

Gironde's 2nd

Nord's 8th 
In the Ifop poll conducted in May 2012, no National Front candidate was named.

Pas-de-Calais's 11th

Pyrénées-Atlantiques's 2nd

Pyrénées-Orientales's 1st

Pyrénées-Orientales's 2nd 
Irina Kortanek was eligible to continue through the second round, but instead withdrew and supported Fernand Siré after the first round.

Pyrénées-Orientales's 3rd

Pyrénées-Orientales's 4th

Rhône's 1st

Rhône's 2nd

Sarthe's 4th

Paris's 2nd 
In the Ifop poll conducted in December 2011, no Left Front, Socialist Party, and Europe Ecology – The Greens candidates were named, Alain Lambert was tested as a candidate of the Democratic Movement, and Alain Dumait was tested as a candidate of the National Front.

Seine-et-Marne's 6th

Var's 3rd

Var's 4th

Var's 7th

Var's 8th

Essonne's 4th

Hauts-de-Seine's 2nd

Hauts-de-Seine's 9th 
The CSA poll in this constituency was commissioned by a group supporting Thierry Solère.

Réunion's 1st

Réunion's 2nd

Réunion's 3rd

French residents overseas' 1st 
No fieldwork date(s) were given for this poll; the date listed below is the publication date.

Second round

Ain's 5th 
No fieldwork date(s) were given for this poll; the date listed below is the publication date.

Aisne's 2nd

Alpes-Maritimes's 1st

Alpes-Maritimes's 2nd

Alpes-Maritimes's 3rd

Alpes-Maritimes's 4th

Aude's 2nd

Aveyron's 1st

Bouches-du-Rhône's 5th

Charente-Maritime's 1st

Corse-du-Sud's 1st

Corse-du-Sud's 2nd

Haute-Corse's 1st

Haute-Corse's 2nd

Gard's 2nd

Haute-Garonne's 3rd

Gironde's 2nd

Nord's 8th 
In the Ifop poll conducted in May 2012, no National Front candidate was named.

Pas-de-Calais's 11th

Pyrénées-Atlantiques's 2nd

Pyrénées-Orientales's 1st

Pyrénées-Orientales's 2nd

Pyrénées-Orientales's 3rd

Pyrénées-Orientales's 4th

Rhône's 1st

Rhône's 2nd

Sarthe's 4th

Seine-et-Marne's 6th

Var's 3rd

Var's 4th

Var's 7th

Var's 8th

Vaucluse's 3rd

Essonne's 4th

Hauts-de-Seine's 2nd

Hauts-de-Seine's 9th 
The CSA poll in this constituency was commissioned by a group supporting Thierry Solère.

See also 
Opinion polling for the French presidential election, 2012
Opinion polling for the French legislative election, 2017
Opinion polling for the French legislative election, 2007

References

External links 
Notices of the French polling commission 

Opinion polling in France
France